Bulacan State Agricultural University or (BSAU) formerly known as Bulacan Agricultural State College is an agricultural state college in San Ildefonso, Bulacan, Philippines. It prides itself of being the lone agricultural higher education institution in the province of Bulacan. Its former name is Bulacan National Agricultural State College (BNASC).

Vision
A globally-engaged higher education institution of agriculture and allied disciplines

Mission
Provide excellent instruction, conduct relevant research and foster community engagement that produce highly competent graduates necessary for the development of the country.

References

 http://www.chanrobles.com/republicactno9249.html

External links

Official site

Educational institutions established in 1952
Universities and colleges in Bulacan
State universities and colleges in the Philippines
1952 establishments in the Philippines